Several colleges and universities offer classes at Joint Base Lewis–McChord (JBLM) near Tacoma, Washington. The Fort Lewis and McChord AFB Education Centers host these colleges, which offer a variety of course work to serve both civilians and military personnel. Several hundred undergraduate and graduate college courses are offered on base each year. Information is available on how to transfer college credits.

See also

 Joint Base Lewis–McChord
 McChord Air Force Base
 Pierce County, Washington
 College Level Examination Program (CLEP)

Notes

External links
 
 
 
 
 
 

Education in Pierce County, Washington
United States education-related lists
Colleges active at Joint Base Lewis-McChord